Kongresshalle (German for "congress hall") may refer to:
Haus der Kulturen der Welt, formerly known as Kongresshalle, Berlin
Alte Kongresshalle, Munich
Kongresshalle on the Nazi party rally grounds, Nuremberg
Kongreßhalle (Saarbrücken)
Sport- und Kongresshalle, Schwerin